Tallman  may refer to:

 Tallman, New York, United States
 Tallman, Oregon, United States
 Tallman (surname), a surname
 Tallman Airport, a private American airport

See also

 Fountain-Tallman
 Lincoln-Tallman
 Tall Man (disambiguation)
 Tallman-Vanderbeck
 Talman (disambiguation)